Mierzynek may refer to the following places:
Mierzynek, Greater Poland Voivodeship (west-central Poland)
Mierzynek, Kuyavian-Pomeranian Voivodeship (north-central Poland)
Mierzynek, West Pomeranian Voivodeship (north-west Poland)